Chico Camus (born January 26, 1985) is an American mixed martial artist currently competing in the Bantamweight division of the Legacy Fighting Alliance. A professional competitor since 2009, he has also formerly competed for the UFC, Legacy FC,
and the RFA.

Background
Camus had a troubled childhood and juvenility, belonging to a gang and using drugs. In 2007, he started training mixed martial arts with Anthony Pettis at his native Roufusport.

Mixed martial arts

Early career
Camus started his professional career in 2009, fighting mainly for organizations in his home state.

In 2010 for NAFC, he defeated Joe Pearson and John Hosman via TKO and lost to Jameel Massouh by unanimous decision.

Legends of Fighting Championship
Camus fought in LFC bantamweight tournament for a contract with Tachi Palace Fights. He defeated Daniel Aguirre in the quarterfinals and Alptekin Özkiliç in the semifinals, but did not compete in the finals due to signing with the UFC.

Ultimate Fighting Championship
Camus faced Dustin Pague on August 11, 2012, at UFC 150. He won the fight via unanimous decision (29–28, 30–27, 29–28).

Camus faced promotional newcomer Dustin Kimura on February 2, 2013, at UFC 156. He lost the fight via submission in the third round.

Camus faced Kyung Ho Kang on August 31, 2013, at UFC 164. He won the fight via unanimous decision (29–28, 29–28, 30–27).

Camus faced Yaotzin Meza on January 25, 2014, at UFC on Fox 10. Originally, he won the fight via unanimous decision (30–27, 29–28, 29–28) but the result was overturned after Camus failed a post fight drug test.

Camus faced Chris Holdsworth on May 24, 2014, at UFC 173, replacing Kyung Ho Kang. He lost the fight via unanimous decision.

Camus faced Brad Pickett in a flyweight bout on November 22, 2014, at UFC Fight Night 57. He won the back-and-forth fight via split decision.

Camus faced Henry Cejudo on June 13, 2015, at UFC 188. He lost the fight by unanimous decision.

Camus faced Kyoji Horiguchi at UFC Fight Night 75 on September 27, 2015. He lost the fight by unanimous decision and was subsequently released from the promotion.

Personal life
Camus has four children: Armani, Isaiah and twins Amara and Noah.

Championships and accomplishments

Mixed martial arts
Legends of Fighting Championship
LFC Bantamweight Tournament Finalist (2012)
Gladiators Cage Fighting
GCF Bantamweight Championship (One time)

Mixed martial arts record

|-
|Loss
|align=center|18–8 (1)
|Ricky Simón
|Decision (unanimous)
|Legacy Fighting Alliance 29
|
|align=center| 3
|align=center| 5:00
|Prior Lake, Minnesota, United States
|
|-
|Win
|align=center|18–7 (1)
|Andrew Whitney
|Decision (unanimous)
|Driller Promotions - No Mercy 6
|
|align=center| 3
|align=center| 5:00
|Mahnomen, Minnesota, United States
|
|-
|Win
|align=center|17–7 (1)
|Darrick Minner
|Decision (unanimous)
|Legacy Fighting Alliance 2
|
|align=center| 3
|align=center| 5:00
|Prior Lake, Minnesota, United States
|Returned to Bantamweight.
|-
|Win
|align=center|16–7 (1) 
|Czar Sklavos
| Decision (unanimous)
|RFA 40: Sklavos vs. Camus
|
|align=center|3
|align=center|5:00
|Prior Lake, Minnesota, United States
| 
|-
|Win
|align=center|15–7 (1) 
|Matt Brown
| Decision (unanimous)
|RFA 36: Brown vs. Camus
|
|align=center|3
|align=center|5:00
|Prior Lake, Minnesota, United States
| 
|-
|Loss
|align=center|14–7 (1) 
|Kyoji Horiguchi
| Decision (unanimous)
|UFC Fight Night: Barnett vs. Nelson
|
|align=center|3
|align=center|5:00
|Saitama, Japan
| 
|-
|Loss
|align=center|14–6 (1)
|Henry Cejudo
|Decision (unanimous)
|UFC 188
|
|align=center|3
|align=center|5:00
|Mexico City, Mexico
|
|-
|Win
|align=center|14–5 (1)
|Brad Pickett
|Decision (split)
|UFC Fight Night: Edgar vs. Swanson
|
|align=center|3
|align=center|5:00
|Austin, Texas, United States
|
|-
|Loss
|align=center|13–5 (1)
|Chris Holdsworth
|Decision (unanimous)
|UFC 173
|
|align=center|3
|align=center|5:00
|Las Vegas, Nevada, United States
|
|-
|NC
|align=center|13–4 (1)
|Yaotzin Meza
|NC (overturned)
|UFC on Fox: Henderson vs. Thomson
|
|align=center|3
|align=center|5:00
|Chicago, Illinois, United States
|
|-
|Win
|align=center|13–4
|Kyung Ho Kang
|Decision (unanimous)
|UFC 164
|
|align=center|3
|align=center|5:00
|Milwaukee, Wisconsin, United States
|
|-
|Loss
|align=center|12–4
|Dustin Kimura
|Submission (rear-naked choke)
|UFC 156
|
|align=center|3
|align=center|1:50
|Las Vegas, Nevada, United States
|
|-
|Win
|align=center|12–3
|Dustin Pague
|Decision (unanimous)
|UFC 150
|
|align=center|3
|align=center|5:00
|Denver, Colorado, United States
|
|-
|Win
|align=center|11–3
|Alp Ozkilic
|Decision (unanimous)
|LFC 52: Tachi Tourney Semifinals
|
|align=center|3
|align=center|5:00
|Indianapolis, Indiana, United States
|
|-
|Win
|align=center|10–3
|Daniel Aguirre
|Decision (unanimous)
|LFC 51: Little Giants
|
|align=center|3
|align=center|5:00
|Indianapolis, Indiana, United States
|
|-
|Win
|align=center|9–3
|Eugene Crisler
|Decision (unanimous)
|Madtown Throwdown 26: The Return
|
|align=center|3
|align=center|5:00
|Madison Wisconsin, United States
|
|-
|Loss
|align=center|8–3
|Rob Menigoz
|Decision (split)
|Chicago Cagefighting Championship 4
|
|align=center|3
|align=center|5:00
|Villa Park, Illinois, United States
|
|-
|Win
|align=center|8–2
|Nate Williams
|KO (punch)
|Combat USA: Country USA 1
|
|align=center|1
|align=center|1:59
|Oshkosh, Wisconsin, United States
|
|-
|Loss
|align=center|7–2
|Jameel Massouh
|Decision (unanimous)
|NAFC: Bad Blood
|
|align=center|3
|align=center|5:00
|Milwaukee, Wisconsin, United States
|
|-
|Win
|align=center|7–1
|Craig Early
|Submission (guillotine choke)
|Extreme Cagefighting Organization 7
|
|align=center|2
|align=center|2:30
|Wisconsin Dells, Wisconsin, United States
|
|-
|Win
|align=center|6–1
|John Hosman
|TKO (punches)
|NAFC: Unstoppable
|
|align=center|3
|align=center|2:51
|Oconomowoc, Wisconsin, United States
|
|-
|Win
|align=center|5–1
|Joe Pearson
|TKO (punches)
|NAFC: Stand Your Ground
|
|align=center|2
|align=center|3:57
|West Allis, Wisconsin, United States
|
|-
|Win
|align=center|4–1
|Ken Sitsler
|TKO (punches)
|GCF: Fair Warning
|
|align=center|1
|align=center|3:32
|Milwaukee, Wisconsin, United States
|
|-
|Win
|align=center|3–1
|Marco Daniels
|Submission (rear-naked choke)
|GCF: Clash of the Titans
|
|align=center|2
|align=center|1:52
|Milwaukee, Wisconsin, United States
|
|-
|Win
|align=center|2–1
|Seth Marquez
|Decision (unanimous)
|GCF: The Good, the Bad and the Ugly
|
|align=center|3
|align=center|5:00
|Milwaukee, Wisconsin, United States
|
|-
|Loss
|align=center|1–1
|Marco Daniels
|TKO (punches) 
|Racine Fight Night 2
|
|align=center|1
|align=center|1:43
|Racine, Wisconsin, United States
|
|-
|Win
|align=center|1–0
|Scott Blevins
|Submission (punches)
|Evolution Fighting Championships 7
|
|align=center|1
|align=center|1:15
|Oshkosh, Wisconsin, United States
|

See also
 List of current UFC fighters
 List of male mixed martial artists

References

External links
 
 

1985 births
Living people
American male mixed martial artists
Mixed martial artists from Wisconsin
Flyweight mixed martial artists
Bantamweight mixed martial artists
Ultimate Fighting Championship male fighters
Sportspeople from Milwaukee